Liam Brown (born 26 April 1985) is a British writer. His debut novel, Real Monsters, was published in 2015 by Legend Press. His second novel, Wild Life, was published in 2016 and his third, Broadcast, was published in 2017. In 2019 his fourth novel, Skin, was shortlisted for the Guardian's Not the Booker Prize.

Early life and education 
Brown was born and grew up in Birmingham, England. After leaving school, he spent "five years working a series of increasingly dead-end jobs", before attending the University of Greenwich. In 2010 he received the de Rohan Scholarship, enabling him to study for an MA in creative writing at Oxford Brookes University.

Writing
In 2013, Brown’s novel Fade To White was shortlisted for the 2013 Luke Bitmead Bursary.
Brown’s debut novel, Real Monsters, was published in 2015 by Legend Press. A short, sharp satire on the war on terror, author Ben Myers described Real Monsters as "a memorable and moving portrait of the futility of 21st century conflict". His second novel Wild Life, "a compelling, chilling investigation into the dark instincts of masculinity", was published in 2016, followed by Broadcast, a retelling of Faust, in 2017. His fourth novel, Skin, was published in 2019.

Works
Real Monsters (Legend Press, 2015)
Wild Life (Legend Press, 2016)
Broadcast (Legend Press/Penguin Random House Australia, 2017)
Skin (Legend Press, 2019)

References

English male novelists
1985 births
Living people
21st-century English novelists
Writers from Birmingham, West Midlands